Paharpur may refer to:

Paharpur, Khyber Pakhtunkhwa, a town and tehsil headquarters in Khyber Pakhtunkhwa, Pakistan
Paharpur Tehsil, Khyber Pakhtunkhwa, Pakistan
Paharpur, India, a census town Gaya district in the Indian state of Bihar
Paharpur, Naogaon, in Badalgachhi Upazila, Bangladesh
Somapura Mahavihara, an ancient Buddhist monastery and UNESCO World Heritage site at Paharpur, Badalgachhi Upazila
Paharpur, Sylhet, in Ajmiriganj Upazila, Bangladesh
Paharpur, Bakshi Ka Talab, a village in Uttar Pradesh, India
Paharpur, Malihabad, a village in Uttar Pradesh, India